Ficus hirsuta is a species of plant in the family Moraceae. It is endemic to Brazil.

References

Sources

Flora of Brazil
hirsuta
Near threatened plants
Taxonomy articles created by Polbot